Chickens Come Home is a 1931 American pre-Code short film starring Laurel and Hardy, directed by James W. Horne and produced by Hal Roach. It was shot in January 1931 and released on February 21, 1931. It is a remake of the 1927 silent film Love 'em and Weep in which Jimmy Finlayson plays Hardy's role and Hardy plays a party guest.

Plot
Laurel and Hardy are Dealers in High Grade Fertilizer according to their door.

Ollie is sitting at a desk smoking a fat cigar, he asks his assistant to fetch the General Manager, Mr Laurel. Laurel says he has been in the "sampler room". He dictates an acceptance speech to Laurel, which tells us that he is standing for mayor.

Ollie is confronted at his office by an old flame (Mae Busch) who threatens to publish an old photograph of herself on the shoulders of Ollie at the beach if she is not paid off. Ollie agrees to meet her that evening to make a settlement. The woman is hastily concealed in the bathroom when Mrs. Hardy (Thelma Todd) arrives to remind Ollie that they will be hosting a dinner party that evening. Mrs. Hardy spots the white ermine fur belonging to the first woman and Ollie says it is an early Christmas present. She leaves with the fur. The blackmailing woman leaves demanding Ollie goes to her apartment that night. Ollie recruits employee Stan to go to the woman's apartment while Ollie attends the party. They phone Stan's wife to explain he will be late but she tells Ollie she will break Stan's arms if he is late. Ollie simply tells Stan he can be out as long as he wants.

Stan goes to the blackmailer's apartment with a bunch of flowers. The woman demands Ollie's telephone number, and she calls him during his dinner party, touching off a variety of misunderstandings and suspicions of unfaithfulness between the boys, their wives, Ollie's butler and Mrs. Laurel's gossipy friend.

The woman eventually makes it to Ollie's house, despite Stan's efforts; Ollie passes her off as Mrs. Laurel to avoid suspicion. After the guests leave, Ollie threatens to kill the woman and then himself, causing her to faint. Mrs Hardy says she will arrange the guest bedroom for "Mr. and Mrs. Laurel" to stay in. Stan looks worried. The real Mrs. Laurel arrives armed with a hatchet and Stan flees.

Cast

Spanish version 
A Spanish-language version of this film was completely re-shot with the stars delivering their lines in phonetic Spanish. It was expanded to one hour by adding scenes of magician Abraham J. Cantu and vaudeville regurgitator Hadji Ali performing at the Hardy dinner party. Titled Politiquerias, the film was released in Latin American and Spanish markets as a feature.

Joining headliners Laurel and Hardy in this version is a supporting cast of native Spanish speakers: Linda Loredo portrays Mrs. Hardy, Carmen Granada is Mrs. Laurel, and Rina De Liguoro is in the Mae Busch role as Oliver's old girlfriend. James Finlayson, however, reprises his role as the Hardy butler and still absorbs the abuse—and even more—from the magician and the regurgitator in the added scenes.

References

External links 
 
 
 
 
 

1931 films
1931 comedy films
American black-and-white films
Films directed by James W. Horne
Laurel and Hardy (film series)
Short film remakes
Films with screenplays by H. M. Walker
1931 multilingual films
1930s American films